The West Riding of Lindsey was a division of the Lindsey part of Lincolnshire in England, along with the North and South ridings. It consisted of the north-western part of the county, and included the Isle of Axholme and the Aslacoe, Corringham, Manley, Lawress, and Well wapentakes.

The administrative centre of the riding was Kirton-in-Lindsey, and the meeting place of the riding was Spital-in-the-Street. It is the most populous of the ridings, and covered . At the time of the Domesday Book, the riding also contained Lincoln, although in 1409 the city left to become a county corporate. Other important towns included Gainsborough.

It ceased to exist when the West Lindsey district of Lincolnshire and the county of Humberside were formed on 1 April 1974, under the Local Government Act 1972.

References 

Former subdivisions of Lincolnshire
Parts of Lindsey